The Ligue de Hockey Junior A Rive-Sud or Rive-Sud Junior "A" Hockey League is a Junior "A" (Junior "C" Canada-Wide) ice hockey league in the Province of Quebec, Canada.  The league is sanctioned by Hockey Quebec and Hockey Canada.  Although the league no longer has its own website, the league is still healthy and running.  Much like minor hockey, there are many multiple-entry teams in this league, they are denoted as (1) or (2).

The teams

External links
League Standing Query

C
Montérégie
C
Hockey Quebec